Salvador Videgain García (26 February 1886  – 12 October 1947) was a Spanish author and theatrical actor, director and producer. He was known for performing comedic and zarzuela roles in Spain and the Américas during the first half of the 20th century. He was born in Madrid, where he also died. He was the son of singers and actors Salvador Videgain Gómez and Antonia García.

Biography 

Salvador Videgain García had heritage from the Basques, Andaluces and Irish. He popularized the following actors in theatre: Ángel de Andrés, Celia Gámez, Rafaela Aparicio, José Álvarez 'Lepe', Teresita Silva, Raquel Daina.

Although few people knew, Salvador belonged to one of the most important families in the country. He debuted in the arms of his parents in 1886, first with Water Last Year (1889), In the time that because this was categorized as frivolous fame got overwhelmed launch the genre of the magazine, which then was imitated much especially after the theater season Martín. But never forgot his beginnings in the zarzuela and was the creator of possibly the anthologies of zarzuela and 4 monster program works in a day. Among his family, two sons were dedicated to acting intermittently, one came up to have the card professional. This family did not want to continue the saga of actors because there is a tradition that does not want to stop working on this craft a successor due to the tragic vicissitudes suffered the same in this work. Sin But there is a family successor in a variant of this job, as a writer is Juan José Videgain, a Spanish writer, is a descendant of him.

The history of the past of his Videgain family is clearly of gentlemen who went down in the Spanish reconquest to take areas of the kingdom of Málaga-Granada towards the fifteenth century, being the Basque branch of that time that had recognized the lineage nobility, but it was during the different centuries when they were connecting with different relevant Andalusian lineages such as the Vilches, the Garcia, the Molina or the Guzmán, making this very particularly different and diverse in genealogy to those of other branches of the same last name that did not descend to it .

Works, the first phase (1900–1909) 

Videgain from small felt the call of family art. Debuted in the arms of his parents in 1886, then intervene in children's performances, first with water last year (1889), yet he dated his debut to an unexpected event, Salvador was studying for trade expert, when he got a substitution of a leading actor, the character was "anchor" of The Fist of Roses Ruperto Chapí, since that success no one expected what was going to get into the Spanish theatrical history. Without knowing it, because at the time of his early performance art was confusing, as a theater director would conduct the initial success of what would be called after the musical comedy in the early 20th century. 
In its early years, the early twentieth century, with the help of their parents start acting in a few roles as a substitute against eventualities actor with repertory works like The Fist of Roses, Giants, Rogues jealousy, The white house, The Feast of San Anton, The Ballad of light, The Barber of Seville, The unruly, The saint of the Isidra ... Then after the death of his father, continues to support his mother and brother of the famous master, Antonio Videgain in many provinces such as Cordoba, Barcelona, Bilbao, Zaragoza, Burgos and Alicante premiered his first works at the national level: the tunnel, heaven and earth, The girl's temple, Nido galante, La patria chica, the girl's boyfriend, and gets The huertanica go make a name as a comic tenor.

The second stage "The launch of the Star" (1909–1919)

After making a name as a comic actor in the provinces and having his first company, will begin in 1909 engaged in the Teatro de la Zarzuela in works such as chopping, Bohemians, The Horseman of the guard and the brand new club single by Pablo Luna a disastrous event occurs one night in November, after he kicked last night by the absence of a soprano, someone with a cigarette caused the fire most important of the genre, the theater is completely obliterated and only save the rooms of some artists and these by and have completed their trabajo. De there will be recruited for the Grand Theatre where the comedy begins to create music with titles like The Riviera, The soul of love, The white deer, The poet of life, or magazine with the fairyland all in (1910). Apollo Theater in Madrid triumphed in the genre of zarzuela in the 1910–1911–1912 and 1913 seasons. The titles speak for themselves: The trust of philanderers José Serrano, The car of the devil, Gloria in excelsis, The fate of Isabelita, For peteneras, Blood and Sand by Pablo Luna, The boy in the cafeteria of Rafael Calleja Gómez, Barbarossaof Sinesio Delgado, Anita Amadeo Vives's cheerful, lily among thorns drama Gregorio Martínez Sierra, La Romerito 1912 Paul Luna, El Goya fresco, The Daughters of Lemos, Cadets Queen Cuisine, The Tale dragon castizo Child, The musical lothario, Don Juan Women's, sing Mills, Brook, La Cocagne, Latino muses Manuel Penella, The joy of love, The new capital testamento. Curiosamente makes no room so many new players and began a tour ending in Spain, which lasts several years settling in Barcelona and Valladolid and manages to maintain its reputation and prestige and wait for his next great opportunity.

The third stage "as a great recognition of the scene" (1919–1936)

Martín achieved in the theater make great 1919–1920–1921–1922–1923 full seasons. Even the titles speak for themselves as large musical genre and revista. The corsair (1919), The Fall of the late (1920s), The perfect wife of Francisco Alonso, Linnet Courting (1921), Eye for an Eye, The Jewish capricious, The pretty haggard, Sanatorium of love, The great Pasha (1922), Venus in Chamberí, Women's body, The rush of pure, Dumb Time, The wedding gift (1923), Cabinet model, Present arms, The Land of the stars, The pool of Buddha (1923) by Vicente Lleo Balbastre. In the twenties his success as a director and comic actor are countless, especially after the bombing achieve gender starting to reach frivolous life is friendly, The Venetian Antonio Paso Díaz (1925), To brave love, The Garden of touch (1926), Date Night (1927), Aligui, Daddy doll, The Raja of Cochin and Punishes (1928) even helping out the careers of Celia Gámez. In the thirties continues with alternating successes genres in works such as carnations, The Severe released in Portugal, Beautiful women and Key (1933), The Founding Fathers (1935), The eager Pablo Luna (1935), which consolidate its reputation in both genders and revista. La zarzuela will take you through the theaters in northern Morocco and Andalusia in 1935–1936 premiering works such as The bunch of roses, Katie both of Pablo Sorozábal.

The fourth stage "Sustaining the opera" (1936–1947)

At this stage Salvador shows how for years has been keeping alive a genre like this for years zarzuela in a serious crisis of authors, without any subsidies and get their own money to revive the genre endures as something typically Spanish. As director of several opera premieres in Madrid obtains some during the Spanish war civil Rosa de Triana (1937), The bell-ringer, Where are you going with shawl? (1938), Bartolo's Flute 1939, but as far as is known this time is the large number of works that go through the Teatro Ideal, at this time passes almost all the works of the country. The years zarzuela brings forty times of crisis, you have to alternate in all genres and appear in other more unusual for him La princesa maniquí and Joy (1946), first performance of Carmen Morell y Pepe Blanco. During the forties get success in magazines and musical comedies in works The arms and take, The Eye in Black, Women of Fire, Honeymoon in Cairo and My heart Ladybug Lady premiered in Barcelona (1943) as director of the company of Francisco Alonso and actor and director in the company of Luis Sagi-Vela with the comedy musical Qué sabes tú (1944). As for the zarzuela achieved success in the company of Pedro Terol and Matilde Vázquez, Alhambra (1940), The house of the three girls, Real Artemio as Lily ivory, Como lirio de marfil (1945). As director of the company premiere of Elio Guzman witches dance together with Aníbal Vela La danza de las brujas (1942), The gypsy painter (1943) and Serranía (1944). In the same way was company (1947) through the cities of Zaragoza, Valladolid and Palencia with its extensive repertoire of works and premiering zarzuela  The guitar of Aragón. The most prestigious of the 40th for him was to be the director of the company of maestro Manuel López-Quiroga Miquel in the theater Alcalá (1941) premiered Ugly Queen the master himself, Divine rebellion and The cat black with Pepita Embill and Plácido Domingo Ferrer. Also he was twice the company's director of Madrid's Calderon Theater, the first premiered at the Teatro Eslava with Maurice Chevalier's operetta The Love Parade (1942) with Antonio Middle and Pepita Embil. La second in a shift that began in the summer of 1946 leaving the Calderon Theater in Madrid and Salamanca, where he led for the first time the Gran Vía theater, Seville, Gibraltar, Granada, Alicante, Zaragoza...

In 1947 He triumphed for Spain with his own company of zarzuela in the tour Zaragoza, Briviesca, Valladolid... After stopping to take a break and reform the company in October he became ill unexpectedly dying on the birthday of his second son, Manuel. The good Madrid society was able to go to his funeral in the sacramental of Almudena. All the Spanish press picked up the sad news of his death because of what it meant for the world of the scene and his fans.

Filmography

Discography

Titles of works as a writer and author

As a librettist and playwright who collaborated known in most of his works with Juan Ortuño and part of the music with Manuel López-Quiroga Miquel.

References 

 The real life and history of the theater (2005) Juan José Videgain  . His life and his family.
 The zarzuela Salvador Valverde (1979). Songs played him.
 Dictionary of Spain and Spanish zarzuela MªLuz González and others (2002) ICCMU Vol II. , His biography.
 Dictionary theater akal (1997) Manuel Gómez García , listed as company director and author on various pages.
 Ramon Femenía magazine (1997) , The greatest successes who got in magazine.
 The scene in Madrid between 1918–1926 Ed.Fundamentos M.Fca.Vilches and Dru Dougherty (1995). His career as an actor, director and entrepreneur during those years.
 The scene M.Fca.Vilches Madrid between 1926–1931 and Dru Dougherty (1998) Ed.Fundamentos. His career as an actor, director and entrepreneur during those years.
 A century of Spanish cinema Ed.planeta Luis Gasca (1998)  characters did in the films of that decade, see titles of the films.
 Catalog of Spanish cinema movies Angel Luis Hueso 1941–1950  characters did in the films of that decade, see titles of the films.
 Salvador in list theathe Apolo La correspondencia de España granvia.memoriademadrid.es/.../Imp_19606_hem_com_19100825_t.pdf
 Nosotros los artistas (2017)

Further reading 

 Juan José Videgain La autentica vida e historia del teatro book biography (2005)
 Teatralerias, tres siglos de la escena, (2018) Madrid: P & V,

See also 
House of Guzmán

External links 

 The family's official website

1886 births
1947 deaths
Spanish male stage actors
Theatre managers and producers
Spanish male models
Spanish male film actors
Male actors from Madrid
Spanish male child actors
Salvador
Spanish people of Irish descent
20th-century Spanish male actors
Spanish emigrants to Argentina
20th-century Spanish male singers
20th-century Spanish singers
Burials at Cementerio de la Almudena
Spanish emigrants to Venezuela
Writers from Madrid